Fabrica di Roma is a  (municipality) in the Province of Viterbo in the Italian region of Latium, located about  northwest of Rome and about  south-east of Viterbo.

Fabrica di Roma borders the following municipalities: Carbognano, Castel Sant'Elia, Civita Castellana, Corchiano, Nepi, Vallerano, Vignanello.

Main sights
Collegiata di San Silvestro, enlarged and renovated in the 16th century. In the apse is a 16th-century fresco by the Torresani brothers.
 Church of Santa Madre della Pietà, from the late 15th century
Farnese Castle, restored in 1539 by Pierluigi Farnese, who annexed it to the Duchy of Castro.
Ruins of Falerii Novi, with the ancient church of S. Maria in Falerii and the catacombs of S. Gratiliano and S.ta Felicissima.

References

External links

Cities and towns in Lazio
Castles in Italy